Chrysochus auratus, the dogbane beetle, of eastern North America, is a member of the leaf beetle subfamily Eumolpinae. It is primarily found east of the Rocky Mountains.  Its diet mainly consists of dogbane (Apocynum), specifically Apocynum cannabinum and Apocynum androsaemifolium, and occasionally it eats milkweed. It is 8-11 mm long and has a convex, oval shape.

Description 
The adults are an iridescent blue-green with a metallic copper, golden or crimson shine. Dogbane beetles range from 8 to 11 mm in length, and they are oblong and convex in shape. The head contains two antennae that are widely set apart and located between the beetle's eyes. They are twelve-jointed with eleven segments, and the basal segment is shorter than that of the second segment.

The larvae have white bodies and brown heads.

Distribution and habitat 
Because the dogbane beetle's main source of food is dogbane leaves, they live in areas where this plant is abundant, such as fields, forests, railroads and lakeshores.

Chrysochus auratus is generally found in eastern North America, spanning the entire eastern United States and into adjacent southern Canada west of the Rocky Mountains. At the western edge of its range, it extends west of the Rocky Mountains into Arizona and Utah. The related species Chrysochus cobaltinus, in contrast, is found exclusively in western North America, and the two species were historically considered to have allopatric distributions. Recently, at least two narrow regions in western North America have been documented where both C. auratus and C. cobaltinus occur and apparently interbreed.

Diet 
Dogbane beetles feed on plants in the Apocynum genus. Plants in this genus contain toxins (cardenolides) that, when ingested, are fatal to many organisms, including humans, causing cardiac arrest. However, the dogbane beetle is able to consume the plant and compartmentalize the cardenolides into glands. If threatened, the beetle can secrete the cardenolides as a defense mechanism. Cardenolides bind to and block the Na+/K+-ATPase which is present in many organisms, including other beetles. Chrysochus auratus has a single amino acid substitution in their Na+/K+-ATPase when compared to closely related beetle species that are susceptible to cardenolides. This mutation may explain the dogbane beetle's insensitivity to the poisonous compounds, especially because this same mutation has been shown in the cardenolide-insensitive monarch butterfly.

Reproduction
Adult male and female dogbane beetles usually reproduce every day, about once each day. In this species, males are the picky of the two, and they will search for the fittest females to mate with. The way in which a male chooses which female is the most fit is via chemical signaling systems. Dogbane beetles have notoriously low overall fitness, so the males have evolutionarily become more careful when choosing mates. Dogbane beetles use sex pheromones known as cuticular hydrocarbon signals to find which females are the fittest and which are not going to increase their direct fitness through procreation. They are also known to be polygamous, and procreating often increases fecundity, and in turn fitness. When the male has found a suitable mate, copulation begins. Copulation tends to occur earlier in the day and usually takes from an hour to an hour and a half, because the male perches himself on the female's back after insemination to make sure that she uses his sperm to fertilize her eggs and to keep other males away from the female. No parental care has been reported, except the fecal sac that she surrounds her eggs with when attaching them to the underside of the dogbane leaf. 

Females lay two or three eggs on the underside of dogbane leaves in the summer. The eggs are kept in an adhesive cylindrical sac of the female's feces, that allows them to stay attached to the underside of the leaves. This also protects the eggs. When an egg has hatched, a larva begins to eat through the fecal sac until it makes a hole large enough to exit from. Then the larva falls from the sac to the ground, where it begins to burrow until it finds dogbane roots, which it eats until it pupates. Dogbane beetles usually pupate in the spring. The larva pupates in a cavity under the soil until its body is matured and strong enough to dig back up to the surface. After pupation, the organism is an adult. The lifespan of this organism ranges from 40 to 60 days.

References

External links
 One gorgeous beetle: Dogbane leaf beetle, Chrysochus auratus Bug of the Week

Eumolpinae
Beetles of North America
Taxa named by Johan Christian Fabricius
Beetles described in 1775